Palmitoyl acyltransferase is a group of enzymes that transfer palmityl group to -SH group on cysteine on a protein.  This modification increases the hydrophobicity of the protein, thereby increasing the association to plasma membrane or other intramembraneous compartments.

Domain structure
The palmitoyl acyltransferase was isolated and identified in 1999.  The catalytic domain of the protein has aspartate-histidine-histidine-cysteine (DHHC) in the core and therefore is called DHHC domain.

Substrate proteins
The example of substrate includes H-Ras, N-ras, R-Ras, RhoB, Cdc42 inform 2, Rab10, Galpha subunit of trimeric GTP binding proteins, Src family tyrosine kinases, GAP53, eNOS, AMPA receptor subunit GluR1 and GluR2, GABAA receptor gamma2 subunit, aquaporin, KV1.1, rhodopsin, beta2-adrenergic receptor, and PSD-95.
https://swisspalm.org/enzymes

Physiological Functions
The protein palmitoylation is a reversible process. The addition of palmitoyl group increase the membrane association of the substrate protein while the removal by palmitoyl thioesterase decreases the membrane association.

References
 
 

Post-translational modification
Carcinogenesis
EC 2.3.1